Puppy chow may mean:
 Puppy Chow, a brand of dog food marketed by Nestlé Purina PetCare
 Food suitable for puppies, see Puppy nutrition
 Puppy chow (snack), a sweet snack for human consumption